Koujeng Leima is a goddess in Meitei mythology and religion. She is a wife of God Koupalu (Koubru). She is of tribal origin, but later worshipped by the Meiteis.
She is one of the nine Laibenthous (goddesses who participated in the festival of God Eputhou Thangjing).

Etymology 
The female given name "Koucheng Leima" (ꯀꯧꯆꯦꯡ ꯂꯩꯃ, /kə́u.ceŋ lə́i.ma/) or "Koujeng Leima" (ꯀꯧꯖꯦꯡ ꯂꯩꯃ, /kə́u.jeŋ lə́i.ma/) is made up of two Meitei language words, "Koucheng" and "Leima". Morphologically, "Koucheng" (ꯀꯧꯆꯦꯡ, /kə́u.ceŋ/) is made up of "Kou" (ꯀꯧ, /kə́u/) and "Cheng" (ꯆꯦꯡ, /ceŋ/). In Meitei language (Manipuri language), "Kou" (ꯀꯧ, /kə́u/) means "short" or "insufficient". The term is usually used to mean clothes, curtains, draperies, dresses or tapestries.
"Cheng" (ꯆꯦꯡ, /ceŋ/) or its derivative "Jeng" (ꯖꯦꯡ, /jeŋ/) means "to become narrower" or "to get compressed" in Meitei language (Manipuri language).
The Meitei term "Leima" (ꯂꯩꯃ, /lə́i.ma/) means queen. The word "Leima" (ꯂꯩꯃ, /lə́i.ma/) itself is made up of two words, "Lei" (ꯂꯩ, /lə́i/) and "Ma" (ꯃ, /ma/). "Lei" (ꯂꯩ, /lə́i/) means land and "Ma" (ꯃ, /ma/) means mother.

Mythology 
Legends say that goddess Koujeng Leima is a tribal lady. So she has a separate home. She is not allowed to participate in the assembly of the gods and goddesses at the Lai Haraoba of God Koubru. In the evening of the day of Lai Lamthokpa ceremony of the Lai Haraoba festival, God Koubru, his wife, his son and his daughter-in-law visited the shrine of goddess Koujeng Leima.

Worship 
One day of the Lai Haraoba of God Koubru is especially shifted to the abode (pantheon) of Goddess Koujeng Leima. It is done in her honor. In the shrine of goddess Koujeng Leima, every single events done at other days will be re-enacted.

During the period of political turmoil in September, 2009, many pilgrims offered prayers to Goddess Koujeng Leima in her sacred shrine of the "Koujeng Leima Lairembi Laiphamlen" in Sekmai. They invoked her for the success of the movements led by the Apunba Lup and for the restoration of peace in Manipur.

Namesake 
The "Koujeng Leima Youth Development Organisation" is an active youth group in Sekmai region of Manipur. It functions in the actions against drugs and intoxicants. On the 31st December 2013 and the New Year Day of 2014, the organization imposed a ban on picnicking in Sekmai. Later, the ban was lifted. However, they cautioned people not to drink alcohol and become drunk.

See also 
 Kounu
 Nungthel Leima
 Loyalakpa

References

Bibliography 

 Division, India Census (1969). Minapur. Office of the Registrar General. p. 15.
 Lancha, Ningthouja. KANGLA LANPUNG Volume VIII Issue II: Summer 2014. RK Sanatomba Memorial Trust, Imphal.
 General, India Office of the Registrar (1962). Census of India, 1961. Manager of Publications. p. 48.
 
Abundance goddesses
Arts goddesses
Asian goddesses
Beauty goddesses
Dance goddesses
Fortune goddesses
Leima
Love and lust goddesses
Magic goddesses
Maintenance goddesses
Marriage goddesses
Meitei deities
Mountain goddesses
Music and singing goddesses
Names of God in Sanamahism
Nature goddesses
Peace goddesses